is a Japanese fantasy novel series written by Tow Ubukata and illustrated by Yoshitaka Amano. Kadokawa Shoten have published two volumes in December 2000. A new edition written by Ubukata and illustrated by Hyung-Tae Kim was published by Kadokawa Shoten in four volumes between September 2007 and February 2008 under their Kadokawa Bunko imprint.  A manga adaptation illustrated by Ryū Asahi was serialized in Shōnen Gahōsha's seinen manga magazine Young King OURs from January 2020 to July 2022, with its chapters collected into four tankōbon volumes. An anime television adaptation has been announced.

Media

Novels

2000 edition

2007 edition

Manga
A manga adaptation illustrated by Ryū Asahi was serialized in Shōnen Gahōsha's seinen manga magazine Young King OURs from January 30, 2020, to July 29, 2022. Shōnen Gahōsha collected its chapters into four tankōbon volumes, published from January 2021 to September 2022.

Anime
An anime television adaptation co-produced by Wowow, Sony Pictures and Crunchyroll was announced on November 17, 2022. It will premiere on the television channel Wowow and stream worldwide on Crunchyroll.

References

2000 Japanese novels
2007 Japanese novels
Anime and manga based on novels
Crunchyroll anime
Fantasy anime and manga
Japanese fantasy novels
Shōnen Gahōsha manga
Sony Pictures Entertainment
Wowow original programming